WCW Backstage Assault is a professional wrestling video game by Electronic Arts. It was the final World Championship Wrestling (WCW) game released before the World Wrestling Federation (WWF) purchased the company's assets three months later. Backstage Assault features commentary by Tony Schiavone and Bobby "The Brain" Heenan. The game is distinguished by the fact that all gameplay takes place outside of a standard wrestling ring. This approach was poorly received, and the game sold only 200,000 copies.

Gameplay
Backstage Assault is vastly different from other games of its genre. Previous wrestling games such as WWF SmackDown! and WCW Mayhem featured backstage areas as auxiliary fighting locations. In Backstage Assault, all of the gameplay takes place in backstage locations. There is no ring, and it is not possible to go into the main arena in front of the crowd.

All of the matches are conducted under "Hardcore Rules". As in traditional wrestling, one person can win by pinfall (holding the back of the opponent's shoulders to the ground while the referee counts to three), submission, or knock out. But these win conditions may be met anywhere, and the use of objects as weapons is encouraged. It is not possible to end a match by disqualification or count out. As gameplay is limited to only two characters, all matches are one-vs-one with no possibility of outside interference or teamwork.

The game takes place in an arena with seven connecting levels, having sixteen rooms in total. While a match may begin in one room, it can end anywhere the players can gain access to. When beginning 'Hardcore Challenge' or 'Hardcore Gauntlet' mode, they are confined to the Truck Arena for the first match. The player may return to rooms they had already visited as they progress through the modes. They do this by walking through open doors. Winning matches in these levels makes them pernamently available in Exhibition mode.

Players inflict damage on each other to facilitate meeting one of the three win conditions. They do this by executing strikes, grapple moves, holds, hitting them with weapons, or causing the opponent to run or fall against a hazard. Some moves can be reversed, inflicting damage upon the person who initiated it. Successfully performing moves and taunts without interruption will increase momentum. When a player achieves "Max Momentum", they may perform their finishing move before the momentum drops again. The color of a player's name while change from white to yellow to red to flashing red as they take on damage. The more damage they take, the harder it will be for them to resist losing. Players can bleed if they take on took much damage.

The primary gameplay mode is called 'Hardcore Challenge'. The player will choose one character to pursue a specific championship with. They will then play a series of matches against random opponents. The first match will always be in the Truck Arena. After this initial victory, players may choose which connecting room (and therefore which opponent) they shall face next. The difficulty level and number of matches the player must play is determined by which title they choose. The final match will also be in the Truck Arena, and will be for the selected title. Players earn points based on their victories, moves performed and general skill shown. If they lose a match, they are only offered one further chance to win it. Losing the same match twice ends the campaign. Players can save their progress in between matches. If the player successfully wins the title, they will be added to the High Score chart if they are in the Top 10. Levels, moves and most hidden characters are unlocked through this mode. While players cannot defend the title, the character they used will be the designated champion next time they play the same mode.

'Hardcore Gauntlet' offers the player one chance to win seven matches on normal difficulty. They may not save their progress between rounds. Beating the mode earns a high score, and may unlock hidden characters.

'Exhibition' mode allows the player to play a single match against the computer or a second player. It has only three match types; two of which are exclusive to this mode. Normal matches are standard. 'First Blood' matches are won by causing your opponent to bleed, but can only be played on one-player mode. 'Human Torch' matches can only be played with two players. This match type is limited to the Truck Arena, and requires the winner to set their opponent on fire using the flaming barrel near the exit.

Reception

WCW Backstage Assault received "generally unfavorable reviews" on both platforms according to the review aggregation website Metacritic. Daniel Erickson of NextGen called the PlayStation version "a poor title but the potential gives us hope for the [WCW] franchise's future." Lamchop of GamePros December 2000 issue said of the Nintendo 64 version, "If you're a WCW fan, Backstage Assault is a good addition to your collection. Others should just rent it for a weekend." An issue later, the same author said of the PlayStation version, "If WCW is your hobby, then pick up WCW Backstage Assault for your collection. Others should rent it for a day of mayhem."

See also

List of licensed wrestling video games

Notes

References

External links
 

2000 video games
Electronic Arts games
Nintendo 64 games
PlayStation (console) games
World Championship Wrestling video games
Professional wrestling games
Multiplayer and single-player video games
Video games developed in the United States
Kodiak Interactive games